James Davison (born 1986) is an Australian race car driver .

James Davison may also refer to:
James Davison (California politician) (1827–1897), American politician
James Davison (Wisconsin politician) (1828–?), Irish-born Wisconsin politician
James Davison (poet/songwriter), English lawyer, poet and songwriter
James William Davison (1813–1885), English journalist

See also
James Davidson (disambiguation)